Mariam Osman Sherifay is a Swedish politician, social activist, pre-school teacher and former member of parliament.

Career
Sherifay was a member of the Swedish parliament between 2002–2003, as a replacement for the Council of State, Björn von Sydow. She was a member of the Housing Committee (Bostadsutskottet) and a deputy for Committee on Foreign Affairs and the European Union Committee, among several other appointments.

In 2009 she was awarded the Swedish , an award founded by Swedish Fellowship of Reconciliation and the Swedish Baptist church for her fight against racism and her written call I refuse to be a victim.

Personal life
Sherifay was born in Cairo, Egypt as the fourth of twelve siblings. Her father came from Eritrea and her mother was Egyptian. Her family was Muslim and attended Catholic schools.  She came to Sweden in 1975.

References

https://web.archive.org/web/20130302231047/http://www.newsmill.se/artikel/2013/02/28/vilka-lagar-m-ste-f-ljas
https://web.archive.org/web/20130301051127/http://www.newsmill.se/artikel/2013/02/25/utvisning-av-illegala-invandrare-r-inte-rasprofilering

Members of the Riksdag from the Social Democrats
Egyptian emigrants to Sweden
Swedish people of Eritrean descent
Living people
1963 births
Swedish people of Egyptian descent
Members of the Riksdag 2002–2006